The 1996 Vuelta a Castilla y León was the 11th edition of the Vuelta a Castilla y León cycle race and was held on 4 August to 8 August 1996. The race started in Valladolid and finished in Villablino. The race was won by Andrea Peron.

General classification

References

Further reading

Vuelta a Castilla y León
Vuelta a Castilla y León by year
1996 in Spanish sport